The following Confederate States Army units and commanders fought in the October 19, 1864 Battle of Cedar Creek, the culminating battle of the Valley Campaigns of 1864 during the American Civil War. Order of battle compiled from the army organization during the campaign. The Union order of battle is listed separately.

Military rank abbreviations used
 LTG = Lieutenant General
 MG = Major General
 BG = Brigadier General
 Col = Colonel
 Ltc = Lieutenant Colonel
 Maj = Major
 Cpt = Captain
 Lt = Lieutenant

Army of the Valley

LTG Jubal Anderson Early, Commanding

Infantry

Cavalry

Army Artillery

Notes

References
U.S. War Department, The War of the Rebellion: a Compilation of the Official Records of the Union and Confederate Armies, U.S. Government Printing Office, 1880–1901.

American Civil War orders of battle

National Archives and Records Administration. "Inspection Reports and Related Records Received By The Inspection Branch in the Confederate Adjutant and Inspector General's Office". 

Index to NARA Microfilm M935, Reel 10: Inspection Reports P-12 to 39-P-24.